Niederfell is a small town located in the municipal association of Rhein-Mosel, which is within the rural district of Mayen-Koblenz, in the German state of Rhineland-Palatinate, near the country's western border.

This town has existed for over a thousand years.  A document that was prepared under the Archbishop Poppo describes donations to the Abbey of Saint Mary in the year 1030 A.D., and Niederfell is mentioned in that document (the Abbey of St. Mary was located at what is now called the Exzellenzhaus in Trier).  That document also refers to an older document of Archbishop Egbertus from the year 980 A.D., and accordingly Niederfell celebrated its 1000th anniversary in 1980.

In the early 1600s, during the Thirty Years War, this town was repeatedly destroyed, and therefore no medieval buildings still exist there. The town's population has been fairly stable since 1950, at about one thousand people.

References

Mayen-Koblenz